Curtis Onaghinor (born ) is a Nigerian male weightlifter, competing in the 105 kg category and representing Nigeria at international competitions. He won the bronze medal at the 2010 Commonwealth Games in the 105 kg event.

Major competitions

References

1980 births
Living people
Nigerian male weightlifters
Weightlifters at the 2010 Commonwealth Games
Place of birth missing (living people)
Commonwealth Games medallists in weightlifting
Commonwealth Games bronze medallists for Nigeria
Medallists at the 2010 Commonwealth Games